Letourneuxia is a genus of large air-breathing land slugs, terrestrial pulmonate gastropod mollusks in the family Arionidae, the roundback slugs.

Species
This genus is monotypic, containing the single species
 Letourneuxia nyctelia (Bourguignat, 1861)
Letourneuxia numidica Bourguignat, 1866 is now considered a junior synonym of L. nyctelia.
Letourneuxia moreleti  (P. Hesse 1884) is considered either as another synonym of L. nyctelia or as a species in the genus Geomalacus.

References

Further reading 
 Molluscos Terrestres. Libro Rojo de los Invertebrados de Andalucía. pages 612-614.

External links
 AnimalBase info

Arionidae
Gastropod genera